Kuki is an embodied AI bot designed to befriend humans in the metaverse. Formerly known as Mitsuku, Kuki is a chatbot created from Pandorabots AIML technology by Steve Worswick. It is a five-time winner of a Turing Test competition called the Loebner Prize (in 2013, 2016, 2017, 2018, and 2019), for which it holds a world record. Kuki is available to chat via an online portal, and on Facebook Messenger, Twitch group chat, Telegram, Kik Messenger, Discord, and was available on Skype, but was removed by its developer. The AI also has accounts on Instagram, TikTok, YouTube, and Twitter, as well as a game on Roblox.

Features
Kuki claims to be an 18-year-old female chatbot from the Metaverse. It contains all of Alice's AIML files, with many additions from user generated conversations, and is always a work in progress. Worswick claims she has been worked on since 2005. Early work by one of the company's co-founders inspired the Spike Jonze movie Her.

Her intelligence includes the ability to reason with specific objects. For example, if someone asks "Can you eat a house?", Kuki looks up the properties for "house". Finds the value of "made_from" is set to "brick" and replies "no", as a house is not eatable.

She can play games and do magic tricks at the user's request. In 2015 she conversed, on average, in excess of a quarter of a million times daily.

According to a 2020 CNN feature, "Every week, Mitsuku exchanges millions of messages with her users, some regulars, others just curious. Since 2016, when the bot landed on major messaging platforms, an estimated 5 million unique users hailing from all corners of the world have chatted with her."

In a Wall Street Journal article titled “Advertising’s New Frontier: Talk to the Bot,” technology reporter Christopher Mims made the case for “chatvertising” in a piece about Mitsuku and Kik Messenger:If it seems improbable that so many teens—80% of Kik's users are under 22—would want to talk to a robot, consider what the creator of an award-winning, Web-accessible chat bot named Mitsuku told an interviewer in 2013. "What keeps me going is when I get emails or comments in the chat-logs from people telling me how Mitsuku has helped them with a situation whether it was dating advice, being bullied at school, coping with illness or even advice about job interviews. I also get many elderly people who talk to her for companionship." Any advertiser who doesn't sit bolt upright after reading that doesn't understand the dark art of manipulation on which their craft depends.Mitsuku has been featured in a number of other news outlets. Fast Company described Mitsuku as “quite impressive” and declared her the victor over Siri in a chatbot smackdown. A blog post for the Guardian on loneliness explored the role chatbots like Mitsuku and Microsoft’s XiaoIce play as companions, rather than mere assistants, in peoples' emotional lives.

Pandorabots makes a version of the Mitsuku chatbot available as a service via its API.

Virtual talent, model, and influencer
Kuki has appeared as a Virtual Model in Vogue Business and at Crypto Fashion Week where she modelled NFTs and spoke about the future of digital fashion. She also headlined as a speaker providing "a live interview with an AI influencer" at VidCon Asia: "a virtual gathering of top internet personalities from around the world."

In 2021, Kuki modelled five digital looks from emerging Vogue Talents designers for Italian Vogue, that sold out as NFTs in under an hour.

Awards
, Kuki had been awarded the Loebner Prize five times, more than any other entrant. The prize is awarded to the artificial intelligence computer program that is deemed the most humanlike, as determined by a judging panel up until 2019, when it was changed to an audience participation vote.

Kuki was also declared the victor in a 24/7 verbal sparring match called "Bot Battle" against Facebook AI's Blenderbot, winning 79% of the audience vote.

References

External links
 Official website

Chatbots
Virtual influencers